Black Point is an estate on the south shore of Geneva Lake in Wisconsin, United States, built in 1888 as a summer home by Conrad Seipp, a beer tycoon from Chicago.  It has also been known as Conrad and Catherine Seipp Summer House and as Die Loreley

The Queen Anne style mansion features a nautical-themed, four-story, "crow's nest" observation tower, which can be seen from many points on the lake; the property also features post-civil war-era furniture.

It was designed by Adolph Cudell.  It was listed in the National Register of Historic Places in 1994.

The state of Wisconsin owns the property and leases it to the Black Point Historic Preserve, a nonprofit organization which manages the property for public tours, which began in June 2007.

The estate and its grounds, including 620 feet of shoreline, are protected from future development by a conservation easement co-held by the Geneva Lake Conservancy, a local not-for-profit conservation organization, and the Preserve.

References

External links
Black Point Estate - Wisconsin Historical Society
New York Times, May 5, 2006''
Magnificent museum: Black Point opens as public treasure after long struggle, Journal Sentinel, July 7, 2007

Historic house museums in Wisconsin
Houses completed in 1888
Houses on the National Register of Historic Places in Wisconsin
Museums in Walworth County, Wisconsin
Protected areas of Walworth County, Wisconsin
Queen Anne architecture in Wisconsin
Houses in Walworth County, Wisconsin
Wisconsin Historical Society
National Register of Historic Places in Walworth County, Wisconsin